The Gabonese Confederation of Free Trade Unions (CGSL) is a trade union centre in Gabon. It is affiliated with the International Trade Union Confederation.

References

Trade unions in Gabon
International Trade Union Confederation